is a private junior college in Chiyoda, Tokyo, Japan. It was founded in 1949 as a vocational school under the management of Tokyo Dental College. It was re-established as a junior college on August 31, 2016.

References

External links
 Official website 

Japanese junior colleges
Educational institutions established in 2016
Private universities and colleges in Japan
Universities and colleges in Tokyo
Buildings and structures in Chiyoda, Tokyo
2016 establishments in Japan